The Twelve Articles were part of the peasants' demands the 1525 German Peasants' War.

 Twelve Articles may also refer to:

 Twelve Articles of the Apostles' Creed
 Twelve Articles of the Bill of Rights for approval while developing the United States Constitution during September 1789
 Twelve Articles of the 1577 Formula of Concord
 Twelve Articles of Faith, of the General Association of Baptists
 Twelve articles of accusation, against Joan of Arc